Paul David Emson (born 22 October 1958) is an English former footballer who scored 38 goals from 321 appearances in the Football League playing on the left wing for Derby County, Grimsby Town, Wrexham and Darlington. He began his football career in the Grimsby & District League before moving into senior non-league football with Brigg Town, and later played in the Conference for Kettering Town and Gateshead.

References

1958 births
Living people
Sportspeople from Lincoln, England
English footballers
Association football midfielders
Brigg Town F.C. players
Derby County F.C. players
Grimsby Town F.C. players
Wrexham A.F.C. players
Darlington F.C. players
Kettering Town F.C. players
Gateshead F.C. players
English Football League players
National League (English football) players